Exportin-4 is a protein that in humans is encoded by the XPO4 gene.

See also
 Chromosome 13 (human)
 Protein transport
 Ran (gene)
 SMAD3

References

Further reading